The Junior League World Series Australia Region is one of six International regions that currently sends teams to the World Series in Taylor, Michigan. The region's participation in the JLWS dates back to 2016.

The process of becoming the Australia Region representative starts in March and April each year with state based tournaments.

Each state and territory (with the exclusion of Tasmania and the Northern Territory) have a set number of qualification berths for the National Championships those positions filled based on state tournament rankings.

Each year in late May / early June, 16 charter teams from around Australia play in the Junior League National Championships.

The entire tournament is held over five days, across two fields at the Diamond Sports Stadium in the Adelaide suburb of West Beach.  The complex is home to Baseball SA and the Adelaide Bite who play in the Australian Baseball League, junior teams able to use the same indoor hitting tunnels at the facility. 

The 16 teams are divided into 4 pools of 4 teams each. After each team plays 3 pool games, the top 2 teams from each pool progress to the quarter finals, whilst the bottom 2 go into consolation seeding games. Every team plays one game, every day, for 5 consecutive days.

Games played on Diamond One (Bennett Field, where the Adelaide Bite play) are live streamed.

Australia Region states

Region champions
As of the 2022 Junior League World Series.

Results by state
As of the 2022 Junior League World Series.

See also
Little League World Series in Australia
Intermediate League World Series (Australia Region) 
Senior League World Series (Australia Region)

References

Australia
Baseball competitions in Australia